The Church of Santi Giusto e Clemente (Saints Justin and Clement) is an ancient church in Volterra, Pisa, Italy. It is also known as San Giusto or San Giusto Nuovo. For some 850 years, the Abbey of Sts. Justin and Clement was attached to it, and it was administered by the monks of that monastery.

History
An ancient church on the site, built at least by the 7th century, called  San Giusto in Botro, was built over the tombs of Saints Justin and Clement, two African Christians, possibly brothers, who, according to tradition, had arrived in Volterra in AD 537 as refugees from the invasion of their homeland by the Visigoths. They soon began to preach the orthodox Christian faith to the local populace there, many of whom were adherents of Arianism. After successfully leading a resistance to the siege of the Ostrogoth king, Totila, Justin was declared the first Catholic bishop of the city. Clement was made a priest under his rule.

According to tradition, the first religious structures were two chapels built at the burial sites  of the saints during the second half of the 6th century. After the destruction of these original chapels occurring during the Lombard invasions, an effort to rebuilt and expand those buildings was done at the end of the 7th  century.  The  complex was completely renovated around the year AD 1000 as part of a  Benedictine monastery.

Construction of the present stone church was begun on October 28, 1628, based on designs by the architect Giovanni Coccapani, which were carried out by his pupil Ludovico Incontri. The new church was consecrated in 1775.

Gated inside the choir, the church contains an ancient altar, inscribed with the names of Cunincpert, 7th-century king of the Lombards, and the steward of the bishop Gaudenziano Alchis, founder of the first temple dedicated to St Giusto. Placed in an urn on the altar are the relics of the evangelists and martyrs, Carissimo, Dolcissimo and Crescenzio, with 17th-century statues by Francesco Franchi. A chapel houses a canvas painting of Elijah asleep (1631) by Baldassarre Franceschini and the church has altarpieces of St Francis Xavier preaches in India (1743) by Giovanni Domenico Ferretti and a Visitation by Cosimo Daddi. The painting of the Madonna delle Grazie (1451), by Neri di Bicci, originally in this church is now housed in the Diocesan Museum of Sacred Art in Volterra.

References

Roman Catholic churches completed in 1775
Giusto e Clemente
18th-century Roman Catholic church buildings in Italy